Saffire was a high end gear-less motor scooter produced in India by Bajaj Auto.

External links
Manufacturer information

Saffire
Indian motor scooters
Motorcycles introduced in 2000